Mihail Andreescu-Skeletty (1882 – 1965) was a Romanian composer.

External links
Biography

Romanian composers
1882 births
1965 deaths